Johannes Winnertz (11 February 1800 – 24 July 1890) was a German entomologist specialising in Diptera.

He was a dealer in Krefeld.

Works
 Beitrag zur Kenntniss der Gattung Ceratopogon Meigen. 1852
 Beitrag zu einer Monographie der Gallmücken. 1853
 Beitrag zu einer Monographie der Pilzmücken. 1863
 Beitrag zu einer Monographie der Sciarinen. Wien, 1867

Collections
Winnertz' collections of Diptera are in Senckenberg Museum, Naturhistorisches Museum Vienna and the Natural History Museum, Bonn.

References

Sources
 Osten-Sacken, C. R. 1903: Record of my life and work in entomology. - Cambridge (Mass.)

1800 births
1896 deaths
German entomologists
Dipterists